Edoardo Stoppa (born 20 November 1969) is an Italian television personality.

Early life and education
Stoppa has a degree in psychology from the University of Padua and studied acting with Lino Damian.

Career
Stoppa worked for Match Music and La7, presenting programs such as Prima del processo, Zengi e Mango, Call game. On La7 he worked for four seasons on National Geographic, presenting and producing documentaries. For All Music he was as co-author, co-creator and co-presenter with Christian Sonzogni the programs Modeland, a satire on fashion and music, and Music Zoo. For Mediaset he was an actor in several episodes of Scherzi a parte and he led Village. He also worked in radio and film.

In March 2006 Stoppa joined Team Sky, to run the international format E!News alongside Ellen Hidding. He also conducted the extreme sports program "SHOCK" on Sky Vivo.

He became a correspondent of the satirical television program Striscia la notizia from 2008 to 2020, where he worked on animal welfare. 
After Striscia la Notizia, he became a correspondent for the program Ogni mattina, where he continues to deal with animals and the environment.

In 2011, Mondadori published his book Per fortuna che ci sei, on his work with animals.

Filmography

Television
 Usa Today (Italia 7) – conductor
 Convoy e Irregular Contest (Match Music) – conductor
 Skypass (Stream TV) – conductor
 Prima del processo (La7) – conductor
 Zengi e Mango (La7) – conductor
 L'uomo Perfetto (Sky Vivo) – conduction with Ellen Hidding
 Call game (La7) – conduttore
 Scherzi a parte (Canale 5) – actor
 Village (Italia 1) – conductor
 Music Zoo (All Music) – conductor
 Modeland (All Music) – conductor
 Striscia la notizia (Canale 5) – correspondent (2008-2020)
 Ogni mattina (TV8) – pet column (2020)

Radio
 L'altro Sport (Top Italia Network)

Film
 Do You Like Hitchcock?, directed by Dario Argento
 Casomai, directed by Alessandro D'Alatri
 Sarai, directed by Franco Calmi

Books
 Edoardo Stoppa, Per fortuna che ci sei, 2011, Mondadori,

Personal life
In 2007 he was engaged with the Brazilian showgirl Juliana Moreira, with whom he had two children: a girl, Lua Sophie, born 25 July 2011, and a boy, Sol Gabriel, born 29 August 2016. They were married in a civil wedding on 10 November 2017.

Stoppa practices skydiving, snowboarding and martial arts. He is a skydiving instructor with over 5,000 jumps to his credit; he is a snowboard instructor and competed with Team Italia in the Campionato del Mondo ISF coming at the top of the world ranking list including races of the Coppa Italia. He practices Muay Thai (Thai boxing), free climbing, surfing, and motocross. He owns a twin-engine, turbine plane to enable the launch of parachutists, and towing gliders.

References

External links
Personal site
 

1969 births
Living people
Mass media people from Milan
Italian television personalities